Pat Gallagher may refer to:

Pat Gallagher (Labour politician) (born 1963), Irish Labour Party politician
Pat "the Cope" Gallagher (born 1948), Irish Fianna Fáil politician
Patricia Gallagher, director at the Académie du Vin and one of the 11 judges at the historic Judgment of Paris wine tasting event
Pat Gallagher (American politician) (born 1974), Democratic politician from Pennsylvania

See also
Patrick Gallagher (disambiguation)